The West Australian Reptile Park is a reptile and native wildlife park located at Henley Brook in the upper Swan valley region of Perth, Western Australia. A privately owned facility, the park is home to a number of reptile species and other animals. Offering the chance for visitors to hold some snakes, lizards and turtles at certain times of day, the park is open 10am–5pm almost every day of the year.

Reptile species
 Southern common death adder
 Desert death adder
 Western tiger snake
 King brown snake
 Western brown snake
 Eastern brown snake
 Dugite
 Spotted mulga snake
 Boa constrictor
 Carpet python
 Olive python
 Water python
 Black-headed python
 Stimson's python
 Perentie
 Gould's sand goanna
 Lace monitor
 Merten's water monitor
 Rosenberg's monitor
 Black-headed monitor
 Frilled-necked lizard
 Western bearded dragon
 Centralian blue-tongued skink
 Common blue-tongued lizard
 Western blue-tongued lizard
 Bobtail (shingleback lizard)
 King's skink
 Freshwater crocodile
 Oblong turtle
 Australian green tree frog (is an amphibian rather than a reptile)

Other animals (mammals and birds)
 Southern hairy nosed wombat
 Euro wallaroo
 Dingo
 Red fox
 Emu
 Brown goshawk
 Blue peafowl

References

External links

Tourist attractions in Perth, Western Australia
Zoos in Western Australia
Wildlife parks in Australia
2003 establishments in Australia